The Windsor knot, sometimes referred to as a full Windsor (or misleadingly as a double Windsor) to distinguish it from the half-Windsor, is a knot used to tie a necktie. As with other common necktie knots, the Windsor knot is triangular, and the wide end of the tie drapes in front of the narrow end. The Windsor is a wider knot than most common knots, and while not truly symmetric is more balanced than the common four-in-hand knot. The Windsor's width makes it especially suited to be used with a spread or cutaway collar.

History and adoption
The knot is named after the Duke of Windsor. He is sometimes credited with its invention alongside his London shirtmaker. It is however the case that the Duke achieved the wide knot that was his signature by wearing ties of thicker cloth that produced a wider knot from the conventional four-in-hand, and hence the Windsor knot was likely invented to emulate the Duke's wide knots using ties of normal thickness.

The Windsor knot is the only tie knot that is to be used by all personnel in the Royal Air Force and the Royal Air Force Cadets (ATC and CCF(RAF)) in the UK when wearing their black tie while in uniform.  However, it is often frowned upon in other Armed Services or Regiments of the British Forces through its association with the Duke, who as King Edward VIII famously abdicated in order to marry American divorcee Wallis Simpson.

The Windsor and four-in-hand knots are authorized for use by all services of the Canadian Forces.

Specification 
In the 1999 book The 85 Ways to Tie a Tie, by Thomas Fink and Yong Mao, the Windsor knot is knot 31 and described in that book's notation as:
 Li Co Ri Lo Ci Ro Li Co T

This notation encodes the following series of steps:
 Start with the tie draped over the neck, with the seam inward and the wide end of the tie to the right.
 Cross the wide end over the narrow end.
 Bring the wide end inward and up so that it passes under the intersection and out under the neck.
 Bring the wide end over to the right.
 Bring the wide end inward and left so that it passes under the intersection and out to the left.
 Bring the wide end up to the center.
 Bring the wide end inward and down so that it passes under the intersection and out to the right.
 Bring the wide end over to the left.
 Bring the wide end inward and up so that it passes under the intersection and out under the neck.
 Bring the wide end down and thread it between the front-most horizontal segment and the rest of the knot. Pull both ends gently to tighten.

Common variations on the Windsor include:
 Li Co Li Ro Ci Lo Ri Co T (knot 32) (the "Persian Knot")
 Li Co Ri Lo Ci Lo Ri Co T (knot 33)
 Li Co Li Ro Ci Ro Li Co T (knot 35)

In fiction
In Ian Fleming's novel From Russia, with Love, Chapter 25 is entitled "A tie with a Windsor knot". James Bond, traveling on the Orient Express, is met by a supposed fellow British agent, who wears "the dark blue and red zigzagged tie of the Royal Artillery, tied with a Windsor knot.[...] Bond mistrusted anyone who tied his tie with a Windsor knot. It showed too much vanity. It was often the mark of a cad."

See also 
 List of knots

References

External links 
 

Necktie knots

de:Krawattenknoten#Windsorknoten